Big stick may refer to:

 Big Stick ideology, Theodore Roosevelt's diplomatic policy
 Big Stick, West Virginia, a community named for the above
The nickname of the battleship USS Iowa (BB-61) 
The nickname of the aircraft carrier USS Theodore Roosevelt (CVN-71) 
 Rural Municipality of Big Stick No. 141, Saskatchewan
 Big Stick (band), an alternative music act who scored a minor hit in 1986 with "Drag Racing"